was a Japanese kabuki performer and an artistic director of the Kabuki-za in Tokyo. He was a prominent member of a family of kabuki actors from the Keihanshin region.

Nakamura Utaemon was a stage name with significant cultural and historical connotations. The name Utaemon indicates personal status as an actor. Such a title can only be assumed after the death of a previous holder, under restrictive succession conventions.

He was considered the greatest onnagata of the post-War period, and was heralded as a "a divine messenger given to kabuki from heaven" during his naming ceremony.

Life and career
Utaemon VI was the son of Nakamura Utaemon V.  The actor's name was Fujio Kawamura when he was born in the sixth generation of a line of famous Kabuki actors.  In the conservative Kabuki world, stage names are passed from father to son in formal system which converts the kabuki stage name into a mark of accomplishment.  The name Utaemon VI was formally proclaimed in a 1951 ceremony at the Kabuki theater in Tokyo.

 Lineage of Utaemon stage names
 Nakamura Utaemon I (1714–1791) 
 Nakamura Utaemon II (1752–1798) 
 Nakamura Utaemon III (1778–1838) 
 Nakamura Utaemon IV (1798–1852) 
 Nakamura Utaemon V (1865–1940) <ref>[https://select.nytimes.com/mem/archive/pdf?res=FA0A16FD3454107A93C0A Utaemon Nakamura"], New York Times. September 11, 1940.</ref>
 Nakamura Utaemon VI (1917–2001)

In a long career, he acted in many kabuki plays; but he was best known for his oyama roles.

Living National Treasure
In 1968, the government of Japan designated him a Living National Treasure, which was a title acknowledging him as a "bearer of important intangible cultural assets." He was the youngest person in history to be recognised a such.

Selected works
In a statistical overview derived from writings by and about Nakamura Utaemon VI, OCLC/WorldCat encompasses roughly 6 works in 6 publications in 2 languages and 9 library holdings

 2006 —  ;  OCLC 70233503
 1993 —  OCLC 054923943
 1989 —  OCLC 029849646
 1984 —  OCLC 054925804

Honors
 Japan Art Academy, 1963 
 Order of Culture, 1979 
 Praemium Imperiale, 1995 
 Grand Cordon of the Order of the Sacred Treasure, 1996 

See also
 List of people on stamps of Japan
 Shūmei

References

Bibliography
 Brandon, James R. "Myth and Reality: A Story of Kabuki during American Censorship, 1945-1949," Asian Theatre Journal, Volume 23, Number 1, Spring 2006, pp. 1–110.
 Leiter, Samuel L. (2006).  Historical Dictionary of Japanese Traditional Theatre. Lanham, Maryland: Scarecrow Press. ;   OCLC 238637010
 __. ( 2002).  A Kabuki Reader: History and Performance. ; ;  OCLC 182632867
 Nussbaum, Louis Frédéric and Käthe Roth. (2005). Japan Encyclopedia. Cambridge: Harvard University Press. ; OCLC 48943301
 Scott, Adolphe Clarence. (1955). The Kabuki Theatre of Japan. London: Allen & Unwin.  OCLC 622644114
 Takeshi Kaneko.  "A Man with the Brilliance of a Flower; Nakamura Utaemon VI," Yomiuri Shimbun. Spring 2009.

External links
Waseda University, Tsubouchi Memorial Theatre Museum;  Permanent exhibit, Nakamura Utaemon VI
 Online digitized photograph:  "Nakamura Utaemon VI meets Rin-Tin-Tin" —  Los Angeles, California, July 2, 1960
 Online digitized photograph:   Yukio Mishima with Nakamura Utaemon VI, 1954
 World Digital Library:  Nakamura Utaemon no Katō Masakiyo, woodblock print c. 1818–1830
 Find-A-Grave: Utaemon Nakamura, Aoyama Cemetery, Tokyo
 Japan Art Academy

Kabuki actors
Living National Treasures of Japan
Recipients of the Order of Culture
Recipients of the Order of the Sacred Treasure
Recipients of the Praemium Imperiale
1917 births
2001 deaths
People from Tokyo
Cross-gender male actors
People from Tokyo Metropolis
Male actors from Tokyo